The Dancing Years is a musical with book and music by Ivor Novello and lyrics by Christopher Hassall. The story takes place in Vienna, from 1911 until 1938. It follows the life of a penniless Jewish composer and his love for two women of different social classes, with an ending set against the background of Nazi persecution.

The piece opened in early 1939 in London's West End, starring Novello. Like many of Novello's musicals, The Dancing Years was given an expensive, spectacular production, with several scene changes and a large cast. When theatres in London closed at the start of the Second World War, the show went on tour in Britain for the next three years. Censorship originally prevented the inclusion of the Nazi element, but by the time The Dancing Years reopened at the Adelphi Theatre in 1942 it had been reinstated.

Synopsis
In 1911, Rudi Kleber, a penniless young Jewish composer, plays the piano at an Austrian country inn, where he has been friends, since childhood with the innkeeper's daughter, Grete; they pledge to marry someday. Maria, an operetta star, arrives at the inn with her older admirer and patron, Prince Charles Metterling, who wants to marry her, but she and Rudi fall in love; he composes successful operettas for her. Three years later, Grete returns from England and has become a musical theatre performer. Maria is jealous and overhears Rudi proposing to Grete in jest, as she has an officer boyfriend, Franzl. Maria misunderstands and does not wait to hear Grete reject the proposal. Maria returns to Vienna and immediately marries Prince Charles, although she is pregnant.

Maria bears Rudi's son, Otto, who is brought up to believe that he is Metterling's son. A dozen years later, Maria introduces Otto to Rudi. Rudi and Maria discover that they are still love with each other, and Maria is unhappy in her marriage, but Rudi realizes that he cannot break up her marriage for the sake of their son. After another decade passes, in 1938 Rudi is arrested by the Nazis for helping Jews to escape Austria, but Maria uses her husband's connections to help him. She assures him that their son opposes the Nazis and tells him that he will be remembered for making "the whole world dance".

Productions 
The musical was first produced at London's Theatre Royal, Drury Lane on 23 March 1939, directed by Novello's frequent collaborator Leontine Sagan. Novello starred opposite Mary Ellis. It closed at the start of the Second World War in September 1939 after 187 performances. After a three-year provincial tour, the show reopened at the Adelphi Theatre on 14 March 1942, running there until July 1944, for a total of 969 performances. It was the most popular show of the war and earned an estimated £1,000,000. After this, the show toured extensively in Britain and was revived numerous times, including in London, and was adapted for film and television. The 1968 West End revival starred June Bronhill.

The Australian production opened in Melbourne at His Majesty's Theatre in June 1946. The cast included Max Oldaker as Rudi, Elizabeth Gaye as Grete and Viola Wilson as Maria.

Original and 1942 casts 
 Rudi Kleber – Ivor Novello (both casts)
 Maria Ziegler – Mary Ellis; Muriel Barron
 Grete Schone – Roma Beaumont (both casts)
 Cacilie Kurt – Olive Gilbert (both casts)
 Franzl – Peter Graves (both casts)
 Prince Charles Metterling – Anthony Nicholla; Victor Bogetti
 Minnie Rayner

Songs 
 Waltz of My Heart
 Wings of Sleep
 My Life Belongs to You
 Three Ballet Tunes
 I Can Give You the Starlight
 My Dearest Dear
 Primrose
 Leap Year Waltz
 Lorelei

Adaptations
The musical was turned into a popular film in 1950. Televised productions were aired by United Kingdom channels BBC in 1959, and ITV in 1979.

References

External links
 Profile of the show at the Guide to Musical Theatre
 1939 plot summary and cast at Over the Footlights
 1942 production at Over the Footlights
 Interview about the musical with Novello’s biographer David Slattery-Christy. 

1939 musicals
West End musicals
Musicals by Ivor Novello
British musicals